Oasis of the Seas is a cruise ship operated by Royal Caribbean International. She is the first of her class, whose ships are the largest passenger ships in the world. Her hull was laid down in November 2007 and she was completed and delivered to Royal Caribbean in October 2009. At the time of construction, Oasis of the Seas set a new capacity record of carrying over 6,000 passengers. The first of her class, she was joined by sister ships Allure of the Seas in December 2010, Harmony of the Seas in May 2016, Symphony of the Seas in April 2018, and Wonder of the Seas in March 2022.  Oasis of the Seas conducts cruises of the Caribbean from her home port of PortMiami in Miami, Florida.

Oasis of the Seas surpassed the  cruise ships (also owned by Royal Caribbean) to become the largest cruise ship in the world at that time. She was herself surpassed by her sister ship Allure of the Seas, which is  longer, although this may have been caused by ambient temperature differences at the times the measurements were made.

Design and description 
The gross tonnage (GT) of Oasis of the Seas at launch was 225,282, but it was expanded to 226,838 GT when additional cabins were added to Deck 14 in 2019.

To keep the ship stable without increasing the draft excessively, the designers created a wide hull;  of the ship sits beneath the water, a small percentage of the ship's overall height. Wide, shallow ships such as this tend to be "snappy", meaning that they can snap back upright after a wave has passed, which can be uncomfortable. This effect, however, is mitigated by the vessel's large size.

The ship's power comes from six medium-speed, marine-diesel generating sets: three 16-cylinder Wärtsilä 16V46D common rail engines producing  each and three similar 12-cylinder Wärtsilä 12V46D engines producing  each. Propulsion is provided by three  Azipods, ABB's brand of electric azimuth thrusters. These pods, suspended under the stern, contain electric motors driving  propellers. Because they are rotatable, no rudders are needed to steer the ship. Docking is assisted by four  transverse bow thrusters.

Additional power comes from solar panels fitted by BAM Energy Group, which provide energy for lighting in the promenade and central park areas.

The ship carries 18 lifeboats that hold 370 people each, for a total of 6,660 people. Inflatable life rafts provide for additional passengers and crew.

Facilities 

The ship features a zip-line, an ice-skating rink, a surf simulator, an aquatic amphitheater, a moving bar, a casino, a miniature golf course, multiple night clubs, several bars and lounges, a karaoke club, comedy club, five swimming pools, volleyball and basketball courts, youth zones, and nurseries for children. Many of the ship's interiors were extensively decorated by muralist Clarissa Parish.

History 

The vessel was ordered in February 2006 and designed under the name "Project Genesis". Her keel was laid down on 12 November 2007 by STX Europe Turku Shipyard, Finland. The company announced that full funding for Oasis of the Seas was secured on 15 April 2009.

The name Oasis of the Seas resulted from a competition held in May 2008. The ship was formally named on 30 November 2009 during a charity sailing for Make-A-Wish Foundation. At this ceremony the ship was  sponsored by seven "godmothers", each representing one of the seven neighbourhoods on board. Her godmothers are Gloria Estefan, Michelle Kwan, Dara Torres, Keshia Knight Pulliam, Shawn Johnson, Jane Seymour and Daisy Fuentes.

During the first float-out of the vessel the tugboats that were pulling the ship from its dock failed to control the ship, resulting in the port side of the ship hitting the dock. This resulted in some cosmetic damage and minor damage to the hull, which was repaired and did not affect the final delivery date of the vessel.

The ship was completed and turned over to Royal Caribbean on 28 October 2009. Two days later, she departed Finland for the United States. While exiting the Baltic Sea, the vessel passed underneath the Great Belt Fixed Link in Denmark on 31 October 2009 at 23:18 UTC. The passage under the bridge was possible due to retraction of the telescoping funnels, and an additional  was gained by the squat effect whereby vessels traveling at speed in a shallow channel will be drawn deeper into the water.

Proceeding through the English Channel, Oasis of the Seas stopped briefly in the Solent so that 300 shipyard workers who were on board doing finishing work could disembark, then left on the way to her intended home port of Port Everglades in Fort Lauderdale, Florida. The ship arrived there on 13 November 2009, where tropical plants were installed prior to some introductory trips and her maiden voyage on 5 December 2009.

Oasis of the Seas had a minor refit in winter 2011. She underwent a second drydock refit in October 2014. During drydock the ship was modified by dividing the main dining room into three separate restaurants.

On 1 April 2019, Oasis of the Seas was undergoing work at a dry dock in the Bahamas when two cranes collapsed onto the ship. Eight people suffered non-life-threatening injuries, and extensive damage to the ship required it to relocate to Cádiz for repairs. The ship returned to service on 5 May, but three sailings were cancelled during its downtime.

On 20 December 2019, Oasis of the Seas was almost struck by  while in port in Cozumel, Mexico. Carnival Legend was on the receiving end of a collision with  earlier that day.

Oasis of the Seas was scheduled to cruise the Mediterranean out of Barcelona in summer 2019 before undergoing a major drydock at the end of the season. Oasis of the Seas then repositioned to her new homeport of Miami for the fall and winter 2019 seasons. She was scheduled to move to Cape Liberty Cruise Port in May 2020.

During the COVID-19 pandemic, the Miami Herald reported that 14 crew members had tested positive for COVID-19. At that time, the vessel had been at anchor near Port Miami since mid-March. The passengers had disembarked for flights to their home countries but the ship remained in the area. By 10 April 2020, seven crew members had been taken to nearby hospitals within a week. As of 4 May 2020, three crew members had died in various hospitals in South Florida.

References

Further reading

External links 
 
 

2008 ships
Ships built in Turku
Ships of Royal Caribbean International